The Clapp-Cunningham Building is a historic two-story building in Chandler, Oklahoma. It was designed in the Late Victorian architectural style, and it was built in 1900 by L.W. Clapp, a politician from Wichita, Kansas. It has been listed on the National Register of Historic Places since April 5, 1984.

References

National Register of Historic Places in Lincoln County, Oklahoma
Commercial buildings completed in 1900
1900 establishments in Oklahoma Territory
Commercial buildings on the National Register of Historic Places in Oklahoma
Chandler, Oklahoma